Whack-O! is a British sitcom TV series starring Jimmy Edwards, written by Frank Muir and Denis Norden, and broadcast from 1956 to 1960 and 1971 to 1972.

The series (in black and white) ran on the BBC from 1956 to 1960 and (in colour) from 1971 to 1972.  Edwards took the part of Professor James Edwards, M.A., the drunken, gambling, devious, cane-swishing headmaster who tyrannised staff and children at Chiselbury public school (described in the opening titles as "for the sons of Gentlefolk"). The Edwards character bore more than a passing resemblance to Sergeant Bilko as he tried to swindle the children out of their pocket money to finance his many schemes.

The first six episodes were subtitled "Six of the Best". In 1959 a film was made based on the show, called Bottoms Up!. The series was revived in colour with updated scripts in 1971–72, slightly retitled Whacko!. In all, it ran for a total of 60 episodes, with 47 of black-and-white and 13 colour, of 30 minutes each. There were three special shorts. There was also a radio version with Vera Lynn starring as herself in the second episode. Many of these radio episodes were recovered by a BBC archivist from a listener's collection of tapes in 2012, and are now being broadcast on Radio 4 Extra.

The front of the historic house of Great Fosters near Egham in Surrey was used in the opening title sequence of the TV comedy series, behind the name of the fictional Chiselbury School.

Cast
 Professor James Edwards played by Jimmy Edwards
 Mr Oliver Pettigrew played by Arthur Howard in 1956–60 and Julian Orchard in 1971
 Mr F.D. Price Whittaker played by Kenneth Cope
 Mr S.A. Smallpiece played by Norman Bird
 Lumley (a pupil) played by John Stirling
 Mr R.P. Tench played by Peter Glaze
 Mr Halliforth played by Edwin Apps in 1956–60 and Peter Greene in 1971
 Parker played by David Langford
 Mr Forbes played by Keith Smith
 Mr Proctor played by Brian Rawlinson
 Mr Dinwiddie played by Gordon Phillot in 1956–60 and Harold Bennett in 1971
 Mr Cope-Willoughby played by Frank Raymond
 Matron played by Barbra Archer, Liz Fraser and by Charlotte Mitchell
 Taplow played by Gary Warren in 1971
 Potter played by Greg Smith in 1971
Proctor played by John Clegg 
 Clodagh Rodgers appeared as herself during the colour series in 1972
 Max Bygraves appeared as himself in one episode in 1960
 Vera Lynn appeared in one episode in 1959

Surviving episodes 
Most of the show's episodes are missing, presumed lost. Six of the original black-and-white episodes are known to exist today; from the colour revival series of the early 1970s, only one is known to have survived.

Only 7 episodes exist in the BBC TV archives, with 3 (out of the 6 remaining B&W episodes) having been rediscovered in December 2016.

TBA 
Series 3 episode 5 (21 October 1958)
Series 5 episode 4 (1 December 1959)
Series 6 episode 4 (3 June 1960)
Series 7 episode 1 (22 November 1960)
Series 7 episode 5 (20 December 1960)
Series 8 episode 2 (4 December 1971)

Theme of School Corporal Punishment

TV comedy historians have written that the central theme of Whack-O! and Bottoms Up! was corporal punishment and specifically the caning of boys’ backsides. This however was largely absent from the revived series in 1971, as by that time corporal punishment was becoming less acceptable in Britain and was eventually banned in state and many independent schools in 1986.

Whack-O! tended to glorify a ritualised form of punishment that  had been an accepted practice in British schools, but by modern standards the popular humourizing of corporal punishment is an anathema, and it may seem somewhat perverted in the way it was featured in the series.
The comedy of the series was built around whether boys would be caught and punished for minor misdemeanours, and the size and effectiveness of canes and the building of caning devices. In one episode a device and long cane was made so six boys could be punished together. In another a device was made so the teacher carrying out the caning did not see the boy, and it turned out that all the backside seen to be caned were that of deputy headmaster Pettigrew (when played by Arthur Howard). A feature of Edwards carrying out punishment was the clear enjoyment he exhibited. 

Both Jimmy Edwards and Arthur Howard were gay men and Anthony Slide, a biographer of Edwards with "Wake Up at the Back There! It’s Jimmy Edwards (BearManor, 2018)", has written: "I know I’m a little perverse, but I cannot find it anything but fascinating and decidedly weird that two gay men were starring in a BBC series involving the use of a cane on the bottoms of young boys."
 Biographer of Jimmy Edwards

This is how the BBC sums up this aspect of Whack-O! on its official website: "Watching the series now is a little painful in one respect – we're too sensitive to find canings amusing – but it's right on the money in other ways, mainly because finding over-privileged kids vile hasn't gone out of fashion."

Details of radio adaptation
BBC Radio adapted the TV scripts into 45 thirty-minute shows, mostly with the original cast, of which 42 recordings survive. There were three series which originally ran on the BBC Light Programme from 23 May 1961 until 22 July 1963. They have been repeated on BBC Radio Extra since 2015 and the last airing was in 2020. 

 Audio Download and Streaming
 Dates of Airings

See also
 List of films based on British sitcoms

References

External links

Whack-O at BBC Online Comedy Guide
BBC Radio 4 Whack-O Episode Guide
British Film Institute Screen Online

BBC television sitcoms
Lost BBC episodes
1950s British sitcoms
1960s British sitcoms
1970s British sitcoms
1956 British television series debuts
1972 British television series endings
Television shows adapted into films